Federal Highway 2 (Fed. 2) is a free part of the Mexican federal highway corridors that runs along the U.S. border. The highway is in two separate improved segments, starting in the west at Tijuana, Baja California, on the Pacific coast and ending in the east in Matamoros, Tamaulipas, on the Gulf of Mexico. Fed. 2 passes through the border states of Baja California, Sonora, Chihuahua, Coahuila, Nuevo Leon and Tamaulipas.

Fed. 2 has a connection to all official ports of entry into the United States, with the exception of the international bridge between Ojinaga, Chihuahua, and Presidio, Texas, which is between the two highway segments. These ports of entry allow road access to the four border states of the United States: California, Arizona, New Mexico, and Texas. As a result, customs inspection stations are common along some stretches of the highway.

Both segments of Fed. 2 are located entirely within the "Hassle Free Zone", which is the zone where a temporary import permit is not required for foreign vehicles. Tourist cards are only required to be obtained by tourists traveling on Fed. 2 between Sonoyta, Sonora, and Cananea, Sonora. The rest of Fed. 2 can be traveled without obtaining a tourist card as long as the stay does not last longer than 72 consecutive hours.

Route description

|-
|colspan=3 align=center|Western segment
|-
|B.C.
|
|-
|Son.
|
|-
|Chih.
|
|-
|Segmenttotal
|
|-
|colspan=3 style="text-align:center;" |Eastern segment
|-
|Coah.
|
|-
|N.L.
|
|-
|Tamps.
|
|-
|Segmenttotal
|
|-
|Total
|
|}
Fed. 2 is divided into two discontinuous segments. The western segment begins in Tijuana, Baja California, and terminates at El Porvenir, Chihuahua, near Ciudad Juárez. The eastern segment begins at Ciudad Acuña, Coahuila, and continues to the Gulf of Mexico at Playa Bagdad, Tamaulipas, in Matamoros.

Between Tijuana and Mexicali in Baja California, and again between Reynosa and Matamoros in Tamaulipas, the route is bypassed by Fed. 2D, a four-lane controlled-access toll road referred to in Mexico as an autopista. Fed. 2 is considered to be part of Pacific Coastal Highway from Tijuana to Fed. 15 in Sonora.

Fed. 2 passes through the border states of Baja California, Sonora, Chihuahua, Coahuila, Nuevo León, and Tamaulipas. The highway also has connecting access to every official port of entry into the United States with the exception of the international bridge between Ojinaga, Chihuahua, and Presidio, Texas, which is within the gap between the two highway segments. These ports of entry enable access from the highway to all four United States border states: California, Arizona, New Mexico, and Texas. As a result, customs inspection stations are common along some sections of the highway.

The joining of the separate improved segments would not decrease travel time as the route follows the course of the Rio Grande (Río Bravo del Norte) around the Big Bend region of Texas. The gap between the two is more directly crossed by traveling along Interstate 10 and U.S. Highway 90 in the United States.

Major intersections

Western segment
Corredor Tijuana-Rosarito 2000 in eastern Tijuana
 in Tecate
 in Mexicali
 in Sonoyta, Sonora
 south in Santa Ana
 north in Imuris
 in Agua Prieta
 in Janos, Chihuahua
 in Ciudad Juárez

Eastern segment
 in Ciudad Acuña
 in Piedras Negras
 in Nuevo Laredo, Tamaulipas
 in Nueva Ciudad Guerrero
 in Ciudad Mier
 in Reynosa
 in Reynosa
 in Matamoros
The eastern terminus of this segment is at Playa Lauro Villar on the Gulf of Mexico.

See also

 List of Mexican autopistas
 List of Mexico–United States border crossings
 List of crossings of the Rio Grande

References

002
Transportation in Baja California
Transportation in Chihuahua (state)
Transportation in Coahuila
Transportation in Nuevo León
Transportation in Sonora
Transportation in Tamaulipas
Chihuahuan Desert
Gran Desierto de Altar